The Minister of State for Defence Procurement is, as a Minister of State, a mid-level defence minister in the Ministry of Defence of the British Government. The current incumbent of the post, Conservative MP Alex Chalk, was appointed in October 2022.

Origins
This ministerial post derives from that of two posts; the procurement aspects of this post were the responsibility of the Minister of Defence Procurement (either a Minister of State or the more junior, Parliamentary Under-Secretary of State), while still the defence logistic aspects were the brief of the Minister of State for the Armed Forces.

This post was created in 2007 to reflect the establishment of the Defence Equipment and Support organisation of the UK Ministry of Defence. Lord Drayson was appointed as its first incumbent. Whilst Lord Drayson held the role as a Minister of State, all of his successors were Parliamentary Under-Secretaries, the most junior ministerial rank in the British Government, until the appointment of Jeremy Quin in 2020.

The post was retitled in 2010 as Minister for Defence Equipment, Support and Technology. The current title of the post is unclear as it has been announced as both Minister for Defence Procurement and Minister for Defence Equipment, Technology and Support.

Responsibilities
The Minister is responsible for:
Delivery of the Equipment Plan
nuclear enterprise
Defence Equipment and Support (DE&S) reform
defence exports
innovation
defence science and technology including DSTL
information computer technology
the Single Source Regulations Office (SSRO)
DIO estates and investment
environment and sustainability in defence.

List of Ministers

References

Defence Equipment and Support
Ministry of Defence (United Kingdom)
United Kingdom defence procurement
2007 establishments in the United Kingdom